Gaurotes atricornis is a species of beetle in the family Cerambycidae. It was described by Pu in 1992.

References

Lepturinae
Beetles described in 1992